The surname Danzas may refer to

Louis Danzas, founder of  DHL Global Forwarding
Julia Danzas (1879 -1942), Russian historian of religion, a Catholic theologian, writer and a Catholic female religious leader
Konstantin Danzas (1801 – 1870), Russian Major General, mostly knnonw as a friend of Alexander Pushkin

French-language surnames